The 24th annual Beijing College Student Film Festival took place in Beijing, China between April 8 and May 7, 2017. This Is Not What I Expected was selected as the festival's opening night film.

Winners and nominees

References

External links
  24th Beijing College Student Film Festival Sina

24
2017 film festivals
2017 festivals in Asia
2017 in Chinese cinema